Plessis (Afrikaans: du Plessis) Plessy, and de Plessis are related surnames of French origin, may refer to:

A plessis meant a fence made of interwoven branches in Old French.

French people
 Alphonse-Louis du Plessis de Richelieu (1582–1653), French bishop
 Armand-Emmanuel de Vignerot du Plessis, Duc de Richelieu, French statesman
 Armand-Jean du Plessis, better known as Cardinal Richelieu (1585–1642), French statesman and cardinal
 Caesar, duc de Choiseul (1602–1675), Marshal of France, born Cæsar Choiseul du Plessis-Praslin
 Chevalier du Plessis (fl. 1660s), French pirate
 Constant Plessis (1890-1930), French First World War flying ace
 Damien Plessis (born 1988), French footballer
 Gilbert de Choiseul du Plessis-Praslin (1613–1689), French bishop
 Guillaume Plessis (born 1985), French footballer from Réunion
 Jacques de Rougé du Plessis-Bellière, French general
 Jean du Plessis d'Ossonville (died 1635), French governor of Guadeloupe
 Phillipe de Plessis (1165–1209), French knight and 13th Grand Master of the Knights Templar
 Philippe de Mornay (1549–1623), French Protestant writer, also known as Mornay Du Plessis
 Suzanne du Plessis-Bellière, wife of Jacques and political opponent of Louis XIV
 Thomas-Antoine de Mauduit du Plessis (1753–1791), French officer who fought in the American Revolutionary War

Afrikaners

Sports
 Bismarck du Plessis, and Jannie du Plessis, brothers and South African rugby players
 Carel du Plessis (born 1960), former South African rugby union 
 Charl du Plessis (born 1987), former South African rugby union 
 Corné du Plessis (born 1978), South African sprinter
 Daniël du Plessis (born 1995), South African rugby union player
 Dean du Plessis, Zimbabwean cricket commentator
 Desiré du Plessis (born 1965), South African former track and field athlete
 Faf du Plessis (born 1984), South African cricketer
 Felix du Plessis (1919–1978), former South African rugby union player
 Gary du Plessis (1974–2006), Zimbabwean cricketer
 Hans du Plessis, South African rugby league player
 Jacques du Plessis (born 1993), South African rugby union player
 Jean du Plessis (born 1998), South African cricketer
 Lilian du Plessis (born 1992), South African field hockey player
 Mark Du Plessis (born 1961), horse racing jockey
 Marthinus du Plessis (born 1932), South African pentathlete, 1956 Summer Olympics
 Morne du Plessis (born 1949), South African rugby union player and captain
 Paul du Plessis, legal historian
 Petrus du Plessis (born 1981), professional rugby player for London Irish
 Renate du Plessis (born 1981), South African competitive swimmer
 Tabbie du Plessis (born 1992), South African rugby union player
 Tinus du Plessis (born 1984), Namibian rugby player
 Wade du Plessis (born 1967), South African association football player
Dricus du Plessis (born 1994), South African mixed martial artist

Arts and entertainment
 Christian du Plessis (born 1944), South African baritone
 Hubert du Plessis (1922 – 2011), South African composer, pianist, and professor of music
 Juanita du Plessis (born 1972), Afrikaans singer, born in Windhoek, Namibia
 Koos du Plessis (1945–1984), South African songwriter
 Phil du Plessis (1944–2011), Afrikaans poet, musician, and medical doctor
 Zack du Plessis (1950–2011), South African actor

Other
 Barend du Plessis (born 1940), South African politician
 David du Plessis (1905–1987), South African Pentecostal minister
 Erik du Plessis, Chairman of Millward Brown South Africa and author
 Eric Hollingsworth du Plessis (born 1950), American author and University professor
 Jan du Plessis (born 1954), British-South African businessman
 Johannes du Plessis (1868–1935), South African DRC missionary
 Susanna du Plessis (1739–1795), Dutch plantation owner in Dutch Surinam

Other people

 Homer Plessy, American litigant, plaintiff in the landmark Plessy v. Ferguson Supreme Court decision
 John de Plessis, 7th Earl of Warwick
 Joseph-Octave Plessis (1763–1825), Canadian bishop

See also
 Le Plessis (disambiguation), the name of 23 communes in France
 Collège du Plessis
 Jaco du Plessis
 Plessis Bouchard
 Plessey, a historic British corporation
 Plessis 1817 ellipsoid
 Plessis, New York
 Piet Plessis

French-language surnames
Afrikaans-language surnames
Surnames of French origin